The Frisbie Pie Company is an American pie company located in Bridgeport, Connecticut. It was founded in 1871 by William Russell Frisbie in Bridgeport, Connecticut, when he bought and renamed a branch of the Olds Baking Company. The company was located on Kossuth Street in Bridgeport's East Side, where workers would toss around the pie tins while on their breaks. The activity made its way to nearby college campuses.

The "skilled person" theory of origin 
It has been noted by the Associated Press that Frisbie supplied pies to many Connecticut retailers and restaurants, including the Middlebury College campus. Middlebury students discovered that the pie tins, inverted, had an airfoil shape which enabled them to be thrown, with practice, in various trajectories.

Commercialization 
The name Frisbie was picked up by Wham-O, a California-based firm who had acquired the rights to the "Pluto Platter". As the pie tin was the same shape, it was discovered that children were already using the term for the flying disc and therefore a spelling amendment to avoid trademark infringement gave birth to the name Frisbee.

Frisbie pies today 
The Bridgeport pie factory closed in 1958; Frisbie brand pies were bought out by Table Talk Pies.

In 2016, Dan O’Connor, a Fairfield, Connecticut resident, Frisbee player, collector and historian acquired the license and distribution rights to the Frisbie Pie Co. He re-launched the company in November 2016 in Bridgeport, Connecticut and began distributing pies throughout the region in early 2017. They sell pies based on the original Frisbie Pie Company recipe.

In popular culture

In Back to the Future Part III, Marty McFly (Michael J. Fox) while time-travelling to the Wild West, finds amusement in seeing the word "Frisbie" at the bottom of a pie plate.  He later throws the plate at a derringer held by outlaw Buford "Mad Dog" Tannen (Thomas F. Wilson), foiling his attempt to shoot Doctor Emmett Brown (Christopher Lloyd).

See also
 Ken Westerfield Frisbee disc sports
 Ultimate (sport)
 Flying disc games

References

External links

New England cuisine
Brand name pies
Flying disc
Companies based in Bridgeport, Connecticut
Food and drink companies established in 1871
1871 establishments in Connecticut
Bakeries of the United States
Snack food manufacturers of the United States
American brands